Common names: (none).

Helminthophis is a genus of non-venomous blind snakes found in southern Central America and northwestern South America. Currently, 3 monotypic species are recognized.

Geographic range
Found in southern Central America and northwestern South America in Costa Rica, Panama, Colombia and Venezuela. According to Hahn (1980), one species has possibly been introduced in Mauritius.

Species

T) Type species.

References

External links
 

Anomalepididae
Snake genera
Taxa named by Wilhelm Peters